Dávid Korisánszky (born 10 February 1993) is a Hungarian sprint canoeist.

He competed at the 2021 ICF Canoe Sprint World Championships, winning a bronze medal in the mixed C-2 200 distance.

References

External links

1993 births
Living people
Hungarian male canoeists
ICF Canoe Sprint World Championships medalists in Canadian
21st-century Hungarian people